"Jireh" is a song performed by American contemporary worship bands Elevation Worship and Maverick City Music, which features vocals from Chandler Moore and Naomi Raine. It impacted Christian radio in the United States on April 1, 2022, as the lead single from their collaborative live album, Old Church Basement (2021). The song was initially released as a promotional single on March 26, 2021. The song was written by Chandler Moore, Chris Brown, Naomi Raine, and Steven Furtick.

"Jireh" peaked at No. 8 on the US Hot Christian Songs chart, and at No. 1 on the Hot Gospel Songs chart.  It has been certified gold by Recording Industry Association of America (RIAA). The song was ranked by Billboard as the fourth biggest gospel song in 2022. "Jireh" was nominated for the GMA Dove Award Worship Recorded Song of the Year at the 2021 GMA Dove Awards. It was also nominated for the Grammy Award for Best Contemporary Christian Music Performance/Song at the 2022 Grammy Awards, and the Billboard Music Award for Top Gospel Song at the 2022 Billboard Music Awards. The song received two GMA Dove Award nominations for Song of the Year and Worship Recorded Song of the Year at the 2022 GMA Dove Awards.

Background
On March 26, 2021, Elevation Worship and Maverick City Music announced that they were releasing "Jireh" featuring Chandler Moore and Naomi Raine, along with its accompanying music video, as the first promotional single from their collaborative live album, Old Church Basement. The album is slated to be released on April 30, 2021.

Writing and development
Chris Brown of Elevation Worship said that "Jireh" was the first song that he, Steven Furtick, Chandler Moore and Naomi Raine had written together and that it's the song that kickstarted the idea for Old Church Basement. "Jireh" was written in the first songwriting sessions for Elevation Worship and Maverick City Music. Naomi Raine also shared the story about the writing session for the song, saying:

Composition

Reception

Critical response
"Jireh" received critical acclaim, being described as "highly anticipated" and a "famous song." A special performance featuring Justin Bieber has been described as having the ability to “take you to church.”

Accolades

Commercial performance
"Jireh" debuted at No. 10 on the US Hot Christian Songs chart and at No. 1 on the Hot Gospel Songs chart, both dated April 10, 2021. "Jireh" attracted 2.1 million streams and 4,000 downloads in the United States in its first week. "Jireh" is the first Hot Gospel Songs chart-topper for all four acts, while being the first Hot Christian Songs top ten entry for Maverick City Music, Chandler Moore, and Naomi Raine, and the seventh for Elevation Worship.

"Jireh" debuted at No. 30 on the US Gospel Airplay chart dated September 11, 2021. The song reached No. 1 on the Gospel Airplay chart dated March 26, 2022, becoming the first Gospel Airplay chart-topping entry for all four acts.

Music videos
On March 26, 2021, Elevation Worship released the official music video of "Jireh" on their YouTube channel. The video shows Chandler Moore and Naomi Raine leading the song.

On April 30, 2021, Elevation Worship published the lyric video of the song on YouTube.

Performances
Maverick City Music performed "Jireh" at the 2021 GMA Dove Awards held at the Allen Arena in Nashville, Tennessee on October 19, 2021. Maverick City Music also performed "Jireh" at the 64th Grammy Awards held at the MGM Grand Garden Arena in Las Vegas, Nevada on April 3, 2022. Maverick City Music became the first Christian gospel group to perform at the Grammy Awards show in 20 years. On June 23, 2022, Maverick City Music performed "Jireh" on their Tiny Desk Concert performance as part of NPR Music's commemoration of Black Music Month.

Track listing

Charts

Weekly charts

Year-end charts

Certifications

Release history

Other versions
 Passion released a version of the song with Maverick City Music on their live album, Burn Bright (2022).

References

External links
 

2021 songs
Elevation Worship songs
Maverick City Music songs
Chandler Moore songs
Songs written by Steven Furtick
Songs written by Chandler Moore